Our Hymns is a compilation album released in 1989 on Word Records. It features well-known church hymns each done by CCM artists' interpretation and styles of music from pop ("Holy, Holy, Holy" by Michael W. Smith) to rock ("Onward, Christian Soldiers" by Petra) to country ("More Love To Thee" by Bruce Carroll). It is also a trilogy of albums from Word Records using the word "Our" in the series starting with this album, along with Our Christmas (1990) and Our Family (1992). The R&B vocal group Take 6 won the Grammy for Best Gospel Performance by a Duo or Group for their interpretation of "The Savior Is Waiting" at the 32nd Grammy Awards. In 1990, the album won Praise and Worship Album of the Year and Amy Grant won Country Recorded Song of the Year for "'Tis So Sweet To Trust In Jesus" at the 21st GMA Dove Awards. Our Hymns debuted and peaked at number 3 on the Billboard Top Inspirational Albums chart.

Track listing

Note: The medley by Russ Taff features the following hymns and its writers: "Near the Cross" by Fanny Crosby and William Howard Doane; "My Jesus I Love Thee" by William Ralph Featherston and Adoniram Judson Gordon; "Turn Your Eyes Upon Jesus" by Helen Howarth Lemmel. The medley is arranged by James Hollihan, Jr. and Loren Balman.

Charts

Radio singles

Accolades
Grammy Awards

GMA Dove Awards

References

1989 compilation albums
Christian music compilation albums
Word Records albums